Joseph Morrison Hill (September 1864 – July 23, 1950) was the youngest son of Confederate Lieutenant General Daniel Harvey Hill and Isabella Morrison Hill. He received his law degree from Cumberland University in 1883. Hill was a successful attorney in Fort Smith, Arkansas and rose within his profession to preside as the Chief Justice of the Arkansas Supreme Court from 1904 to 1909. He died in Benton, Logan County, Arkansas.

References 

Arkansas lawyers
1864 births
1950 deaths
Chief Justices of the Arkansas Supreme Court
Daniel Hill family